Cumberland Municipal Airport  is a city owned public use airport located three nautical miles (6 km) southeast of the central business district of Cumberland, a city in Barron County, Wisconsin, United States.

It is included in the Federal Aviation Administration (FAA) National Plan of Integrated Airport Systems for 2021–2025, in which it is categorized as a local general aviation facility.

Although most U.S. airports use the same three-letter location identifier for the FAA and IATA, this airport is assigned UBE by the FAA but has no designation from the IATA.

Facilities and aircraft 
It has two runways: 9/27 is 4,043 by 75 feet (1,232 x 23 m) with an asphalt pavement and 18/36 is 1,996 by 120 feet (608 x 37 m) with a turf surface.  

For the 12-month period ending July 23, 2020, the airport had 10,900 general aviation aircraft operations, an average of 30 per day. 
In January 2023, there were 18 aircraft based at this airport: all 18 single-engine.

See also
 List of airports in Wisconsin

References

External links 
  at Wisconsin DOT Airport Directory
 

Airports in Wisconsin
Buildings and structures in Barron County, Wisconsin